Elan Coton Basketball Club is a Beninese basketball club based in Cotonou. They play in the Benin Basketball Super League, the premier national league and have won the championship in 2022.

The team was previously named Elan Sport Pro, until it became a part of a multi-sports club named Coton Sport that was founded on 21 January 2021 and is owned by Sodeco (Societé pour le Développement du Coton). Coton Sport also features a football club (Coton Sport FC).

In 2022, Elan Coton play in the BAL Qualifying Tournaments as the representative from Benin.

Honours 

 Benin Basketball Super League
 Champions (1): 2021–22

Notable players 

  Robert Gilchrist

References 

Basketball teams in Benin
Basketball teams established in 2021
Road to BAL teams